Metius aeneus is a species of ground beetle in the subfamily Pterostichinae. It was described by Dejean in 1831.

References

Metius (genus)
Beetles described in 1831